Alex Dockery Dickson Jr. (September 9, 1926 – November 14, 2021) was an American Anglican bishop. He was first bishop of the Episcopal Diocese of West Tennessee, serving from 1983 to 1994. He was Bishop in Residence in the Anglican Diocese of South Carolina at the Anglican Church in North America in his last years.

Early life and education
Dickson was born on September 9, 1926 in Alligator, Mississippi, the son of Alex Dockery Dickson and Georgie Maude Wicks. He studied at the University of Mississippi and graduated with a Bachelor of Arts in 1949. he then enrolled at the University of the South and earned his Master of Divinity in 1958.

Ordained Ministry
Dickson was ordained deacon on May 31, 1958 by Bishop Duncan Montgomery Gray Sr. of Mississippi. He was ordained priest on December 1, 1958 by the same bishop. In 1958, he also became vicar of St Paul's Church in Hollandale, Mississippi. In 1962, he became rector of St Columb's Church in Jackson, Mississippi. Dickson became headmaster of All Saints' Episcopal School in Vicksburg, Mississippi from 1968 till 1983. He lived on campus with his first wife and family until his resignation. He was instrumental in building student enrolment. The school closed in 2006.

Bishop
On January 22, 1983, Dickson was elected after 33 ballots, as the first Bishop of West Tennessee in St Mary's Cathedral, Memphis, Tennessee. He was consecrated on April 9, 1983 at the Memphis Cook Convention Center, by Presiding Bishop John Allin (Allin was Dickson's ecclesiastical superior in Mississippi for some years). He retired on September 30, 1994.

Retirement
After his retirement, he started doing missionary work in Southeast Asia and Africa. He was a theological conservative critical of the Episcopal Church's departures from traditional Christian teachings on human sexuality. He was involved in the Anglican realignment and participated in the consecration of the first two bishops of the Anglican Mission in the Americas, in 2000. He was Bishop in Residence at St. Michael’s Church, in Charleston, in the Anglican Diocese of South Carolina, member of the Anglican Church in North America, at the time of his death, aged 95 years old.

Personal life
Dickson married Charnelle Perkins on October 7, 1948. Together they had three sons: Alex, Charles, and John. Charnelle died on October 16, 1995. He later married Jane Graham Carver on January 2, 1999. Dickson died on November 14, 2021, at the age of 95. He was predeceased by his son, Alex.

References
Footnotes

Sources
Episcopal Clerical Directory (1998)

1926 births
2021 deaths
Bishops of the Anglican Church in North America
Episcopal bishops of West Tennessee
People from Bolivar County, Mississippi
Sewanee: The University of the South alumni
University of Mississippi alumni